Omiodes similis is a moth in the family Crambidae. It was described by Frederic Moore in 1885. It is found in Sri Lanka and China.

References

Moths described in 1885
similis